Sakız is a village in Mut district of Mersin Province, Turkey. At   it is situated to the west of Mut. The population of Sakız was 1028 as of 2012. Main crops of the village are olive and apricot. The artificial pond of Sakız, now under planning will solve irrigation problems in farming.

References

Villages in Mut District